David Jacoby (born 1956) is the Iowa State Representative from the 74th District. A Democrat, he has served in the Iowa House of Representatives since 2003, when he was elected in a special election following the resignation of Dick Myers.

Jacoby currently serves on several committees in the Iowa House - the Appropriations committee; the Human Resources committee; the State Government committee; and the Commerce committee, where he is chair.

Jacoby was reelected in 2006 with 9,639 votes, running unopposed.

Early life and education
Jacoby was born and raised in Marion, Iowa. He graduated from Marion High School and later obtained his B.A. from the University of Northern Iowa.

Family
Jacoby is the son of George and Millie Jacoby. He is married to his wife Lynette and together they have two daughters, Ellie and Anna.

Career
Outside politics Jacoby is a small business owner. His business, Dave's Resale, works in estate sales.

Organizations
Jacoby is a member of the following organizations:
Carpenter's Local 1260
Iowa City Area Chamber of Commerce
Youth Leadership Program Board
Alternative School Committee
Empowerment Board
Juvenile Justice Committee
St Thomas More Catholic Church

References

External links
Representative David Jacoby official Iowa General Assembly site
David Jacoby State Representative official constituency site
 

Democratic Party members of the Iowa House of Representatives
Living people
1956 births
People from Cedar Rapids, Iowa
University of Northern Iowa alumni
21st-century American politicians